Mahagathbandhan ( Alliance) may refer to :
Mahagathbandhan (2019) 
Mahagathbandhan (Bihar) 
Mahagathbandhan (Jharkhand)